Cristóbal Pérez Lazarraga y Maneli Viana, O. Cist. (1599 – 18 February 1649) was a Roman Catholic prelate who served as Bishop of Cartagena in Colombia (1640–1649) and Bishop of Chiapas (1639–1640).

Biography
Cristóbal Pérez Lazarraga y Maneli Viana was born in Madrid, Spain in 1599 and ordained a priest in the Cistercian Order.
On 3 October 1639, he was appointed during the papacy of Pope Urban VIII as Bishop of Chiapas.
On 2 January 1640, he was consecrated bishop by Agustín Spínola Basadone, Archbishop of Santiago de Compostela. 
On 8 October 1640, he was appointed during the papacy of Pope Urban VIII as Bishop of Cartagena in Colombia.
He served as Bishop of Cartagena until his death on 18 February 1649.
 
While bishop, he was the principal co-consecrator of Francisco Diego Díaz de Quintanilla y de Hevía y Valdés, Bishop of Durango (1640).

References

External links and additional sources
 (for Chronology of Bishops) 
 (for Chronology of Bishops)  
 (for Chronology of Bishops) 
 (for Chronology of Bishops) 

1599 births
1649 deaths
17th-century Roman Catholic bishops in Mexico
Bishops appointed by Pope Urban VIII
Roman Catholic bishops of Cartagena in Colombia
Cistercian bishops
Clergy from Madrid